Cornelis "Cor" van der Hoeven (12 May 1921 – 1 February 2017) was a Dutch footballer. He played as a midfielder for DWS and Ajax. He also made three appearances with the national team. He was born in Amsterdam.

Van der Hoeven died on 1 February 2017 in Amsterdam at the age of 95.

References

1921 births
2017 deaths
Dutch footballers
AFC Ajax players
AFC DWS players
Association football midfielders
Eredivisie players
Footballers from Amsterdam
Netherlands international footballers